Chlorophyta or Prasinophyta is a taxon of green algae informally called chlorophytes. The name is used in two very different senses, so care is needed to determine the use by a particular author. In older classification systems, it refers to a highly paraphyletic group of all the green algae within the green plants (Viridiplantae) and thus includes about 7,000 species of mostly aquatic photosynthetic eukaryotic organisms. In newer classifications, it refers to the sister clade of the streptophytes/charophytes. The clade Streptophyta consists of the Charophyta in which the Embryophyta (land plants) emerged. In this latter sense the Chlorophyta includes only about 4,300 species. About 90% of all known species live in freshwater.
Like the land plants (embryophytes: bryophytes and tracheophytes), green algae (chlorophytes and charophytes besides embryophytes) contain chlorophyll a and chlorophyll b and store food as starch in their plastids.

With the exception of Palmophyllophyceae, Trebouxiophyceae, Ulvophyceae and Chlorophyceae, which show various degrees of multicellularity, all the Chlorophyta lineages are unicellular. Some members of the group form symbiotic relationships with protozoa, sponges, and cnidarians. Others form symbiotic relationships with fungi to form lichens, but the majority of species are free-living. Some conduct sexual reproduction, which is oogamous or isogamous. All members of the clade have motile flagellated swimming cells. While most species live in freshwater habitats and a large number in marine habitats, other species are adapted to a wide range of land environments. For example, Chlamydomonas nivalis, which causes Watermelon snow,  lives on summer alpine snowfields. Others, such as Trentepohlia species, live attached to rocks or woody parts of trees. Monostroma kuroshiense, an edible green alga cultivated worldwide and most expensive among green algae, belongs to this group.

Ecology
Species of Chlorophyta (treated as what is now considered one of the two main clades of Viridiplantae) are common inhabitants of marine, freshwater and terrestrial environments. Several species have adapted to specialised and extreme environments, such as deserts, arctic environments, hypersaline habitats, marine deep waters, deep-sea hydrothermal vents and habitats that experiences extreme changes in temperature, light and salinity. Some groups, such as the Trentepohliales are exclusively found on land. Several species of Chlorophyta live in symbiosis with a diverse range of eukaryotes, including fungi (to form lichens), ciliates, forams, cnidarians and molluscs.
 Some species of Chlorophyta are heterotrophic, either free-living or parasitic. Others are mixotrophic bacterivores through phagocytosis. Two common species of the heterotrophic green alga Prototheca are pathogenic and can cause the disease protothecosis in humans and animals.

Classifications

Characteristics used for the classification of Chlorophyta are: type of zoid, mitosis (karyokinesis), cytokinesis, organization level, life cycle, type of gametes, cell wall polysaccharides and more recently genetic data.

Phylogeny
A newer proposed classification follows Leliaert et al. 2011 and modified with Silar 2016, Leliaert 2016 and Lopes dos Santos et al. 2017 for the green algal clades and Novíkov & Barabaš-Krasni 2015 for the land plants clade. Sánchez-Baracaldo et al. is followed for the basal clades.

A 2020 paper places the "Prasinodermophyta" (i.e. Prasinodermophyceae + Palmophyllophyceae) as the basal Viridiplantae clade.

Leliaert et al. 2012 
Simplified phylogeny of the Chlorophyta, according to Leliaert et al. 2012. Note that many algae previously classified in Chlorophyta are placed here in Streptophyta.
 Viridiplantae
Chlorophyta
core chlorophytes
Ulvophyceae
Cladophorales
Dasycladales
Bryopsidales
Trentepohliales
Ulvales-Ulotrichales
Oltmannsiellopsidales
Chlorophyceae
Oedogoniales
Chaetophorales
Chaetopeltidales
Chlamydomonadales
Sphaeropleales
Trebouxiophyceae
Chlorellales
Oocystaceae
Microthamniales
Trebouxiales
Prasiola clade
Chlorodendrophyceae
prasinophytes (paraphyletic)
Pyramimonadales
Mamiellophyceae
Pycnococcaceae
Nephroselmidophyceae
Prasinococcales
Palmophyllales
Streptophyta
charophytes
Mesostigmatophyceae
Chlorokybophyceae
Klebsormidiophyceae
Charophyceae
Zygnematophyceae
Coleochaetophyceae
Embryophyta (land plants)

Pombert et al. 2005 
A possible classification when Chlorophyta refers to one of the two clades of the Viridiplantae is shown below.
 Class Prasinophyceae T. A. Chr. ex Ø. Moestrup & J. Throndsen
 Class Chlorophyceae Wille
 Class Trebouxiophyceae T. Friedl
 Class Ulvophyceae

Lewis & McCourt 2004 
 Division Chlorophyta (green algae sensu stricto)
 Subdivision Chlorophytina
 Class Chlorophyceae (chlorophytes)
 Order Chlamydomonadales (+ some Chlorococcales + some Tetrasporales + some Chlorosarcinales)
 Order Sphaeropleales (sensu Deason, plus Bracteacoccus, Schroederia, Scenedesmaceae, Selanastraceae)
 Order Oedogoniales
 Order Chaetopeltidales
 Order Chaetophorales
 Incertae Sedis (Cylindrocapsa clade, Mychonastes clade)
 Class Ulvophyceae (ulvophytes)
 Order Ulotrichales
 Order Ulvales
 Order Siphoncladales/Cladophorales
 Order Caulerpales
 Order Dasycladales
 Class Trebouxiophyceae (trebouxiophytes)
 Order Trebouxiales
 Order Microthamniales
 Order Prasiolales
 Order Chlorellales
 Class Prasinophyceae (prasinophytes)
 Order Pyramimonadales
 Order Mamiellales
 Order Pseudoscourfieldiales
 Order Chlorodendrales
 Incertae sedis (Unnamed clade of coccoid taxa)
 Division Charophyta (charophyte algae and embryophytes)
 Class Mesostigmatophyceae (mesostigmatophytes)
 Class Chlorokybophyceae (chlorokybophytes)
 Class Klebsormidiophyceae (klebsormidiophytes)
 Class Zygnemophyceae (conjugates)
 Order Zygnematales (filamentous conjugates and saccoderm desmids)
 Order Desmidiales (placoderm desmids)
 Class Coleochaetophyceae (coleochaetophytes)
 Order Coleochaetales
 Subdivision Streptophytina
 Class Charophyceae (reverts to use of GM Smith)
 Order Charales (charophytes sensu stricto)
 Class Embryophyceae (embryophytes)

Hoek, Mann and Jahns 1995
Classification of the Chlorophyta, treated as all green algae, according to Hoek, Mann and Jahns 1995.
 Class Prasinophyceae (orders Mamiellales, Pseudocourfeldiales, Pyramimonadales, Chlorodendrales)
 Class Chlorophyceae (orders Volvocales [including the Tetrasporales], Chlorococcales, Chaetophorales, Oedogoniales)
 Class Ulvophyceae (orders  Codiolales, Ulvales)
 Class Cladophorophyceae (order Cladophorales)
 Class Bryopsidophyceae (orders Bryopsidales, Halimedales)
 Class Dasycladophyceae (order Dasycladales)
 Class Trentepohliophyceae (order Trentepohliales)
 Class Pleurastrophyceae (order Pleurastrales)
 Incertae sedis (order Prasiolales)
 Class Klebsormidiophyceae (orders Klebsormidiales, Coleochaetales)
 Class Zygnematophyceae (order Zygnematales, Desmidiales)
 Class Charophyceae (order Charales)

In a note added in proof, an alternative classification is presented for the algae of the class Chlorophyceae:
 Class Chlamydophyceae (orders Volvocales, Chlorococcales, Chaetophorales)
 Class Oedogoniophyceae (order Oedogoniales)
 Class Chlorophyceae (order Chlorellales)

Bold and Wynne 1985
Classification of the Chlorophyta and Charophyta according to Bold and Wynne 1985.

 Chlorophyta, Chlorophyceae (16 orders)
 Volvocales
 Tetrasporales
 Chlorococcales
 Chlorosarcinales
 Ulotrichales
 Sphaeropleales
 Chaetophorales
 Trentepohliales
 Oedogoniales
 Ulvales
 Cladophorales
 Acrosiphoniales
 Caulerpales
 Siphonocladales
 Dasycladales
 Zygnematales
 Charophyta, Charophyceae (1 order)
 Charales

Mattox & Stewart 1984
Classification of the Chlorophyta according to Mattox & Stewart 1984:

 Micromonadophyceae (similar to Prasinophyceae; Tetraselmidiales transferred to Pleurastrophyceae)
 Charophyceae Rabenhorst
 Chlorokybales
 Klebsormidiales
 Zygnematales
 Coleochaetales
 Charales
 Ulvophyceae
 Pleurastrophyceae
 Tetraselmidiales
 Pleurastrales
 Chlorophyceae Wille in Warming
 Chlamydomonadales
 Volvocales
 Chlorococcales
 Sphaeropleales
 Chlorosarcinales
 Chaetophorales
 Oedogoniales

Fott 1971
Classification of the Chlorophyta according to Fott 1971.
Class Chlorophyceae
Order Volvocales
Order Tetrasporales
Order Chlorococcales
Order Ulotrichales
Suborder Chlorosarcineae
Suborder Ulotrichineae
Suborder Oedogoniineae
Suborder Chaetophorineae
Order Siphonocladales
Order Bryopsidales
Class Conjugatophyceae
Class Charophyceae

Round 1971
Classification of the Chlorophyta and related algae according to Round 1971.

 "green algae"
 Euglenophyta
 Prasinophyta
 Charophyta
 Chlorophyta
 Zygnemaphyceae (= Conjugatophyceae; orders Mesotaeniales, Zygnematales, Gonatozygales, Desmidiales)
 Oedogoniophyceae (order Oedogoniales)
 Bryopsidophyceae 
 Hemisiphoniidae (orders Cladophorales, Sphaeropleales, Acrosiphoniales
 Cystosiphoniidae (orders Dasycladales, Siphonocladales, Chlorochytriales)
 Eusiphoniidae (orders Derbesiales, Codiales, Caulerpales, Dichotomosiphonales, Phyllosiphonales)
 Chlorophyceae
 orders Chlamydomonadales, Volvocales, Polyblepharidales, Tetrasporales, Chlorodendrales, Chlorosarcinales, Chlorococcales
 orders Ulotrichales, Codiolales, Ulvales, Prasiolales, Cylindrocapsales, Microsporales
 orders Chaetophorales, Coleochaetales, Trentepohliales, Pleurococcales, Ulvellales

Smith 1938
Classification of the Chlorophyta according to Smith 1938:

Class 1. Chlorophyceae
Order 1. Volvocales
Family 1. Chlamydomonadaceae
Family 2. Volvocaceae
Order 2. Tetrasporales
Order 3. Ulotrichales
Family 1. Ulotrichaceae
Family 2. Microsporaceae
Family 3. Cylindrocapsaceae
Family 4. Chaetophoraceae
Family 5. Protococcaceae
Family 6. Coleochaetaceae
Family 7. Trentepohliaceae
Order 4. Ulvales
Family 1. Ulvaceae
Family 2 Schizomeridaceae
Order 5. Schizogoniales
Family Schizogoniaceae
Order 6. Cladophorales
Family 1. Cladophoraceae
Family 2. Sphaeropleaceae
Order 7. Oedogoniales
Family Oedogoniaceae
Order 8. Zygnematales
Family 1. Zygnemataceae
Family 2. Mesotaeniaceae
Family 3. Desmidiaceae
Order 9. Chlorococcales
Family 1. Chlorococcaceae
Family 2. Endosphaeraceae
Family 3. Characiaceae
Family 4. Protosiphonaceae
Family 5. Hydrodictyaceae
Family 6. Oöcystaceae
Family 7. Scenedesmaceae
Order 10. Siphonales
Family 1. Bryopsidaceae
Family 2. Caulerpaceae
Family 3. Halicystaceae
Family 4. Codiaceae
Family 5. Derbesiaceae
Family 6. Vaucheriaceae
Family 7. Phyllosiphonaceae
Order 11. Siphonocladiales
Family 1. Valoniaceae
Family 2. Dasycladaceae
Class 2. Charophyceae
Order Charales
Family Characeae

Research and discoveries 
In February 2020, the fossilized remains of green algae, named Proterocladus antiquus were discovered in the northern province of Liaoning, China. At around a billion years old, it is believed to be one of the oldest examples of a multicellular chlorophyte.

References

Further reading 

 
 
 

 
Plant divisions
Taxa named by Ludwig Reichenbach